Self and Others is a psychological study by R. D. Laing, first published in 1961.  It was re-issued in a second edition (1969), which (in Laing's words) was  “extensively revised, without being changed in any fundamental way”.

The book formed part of a series of writings by Laing in the 1960s on the relationship of madness to the self within a social context or nexus, writings which created something of a cult of Laing at the time.

Structure
Self and Others is divided into two parts, called respectively 'Modes of Interpersonal Experience' and 'Forms of Interpersonal Action'. In the first part, Laing sets out from a critique of the Kleinian view of unconscious phantasy, as set out by Susan Sutherland Isaacs, for its lack of recognition of the interpersonal dialectics inherent in human experience. He also uses Kleinian thought to emphasize the omnipresence of social phantasy systems.

In the second part, Laing explored the extent to which an individual is or is not invested in their own actions, using ideas drawn from Martin Buber and Jean-Paul Sartre. He also extended the American concept of the double bind to cover the experience of the schizoid patient.

In both sections, Laing uses material from Dostoyevsky to illustrate his theoretical points.

See also

References

Further reading
M. Howarth-Williams, R. D. Laing (1977)

External links
 The Self and Others
 Jo Nash:Chapter 2 #R. D. Laing, On the Psychodynamics of Social Phantasy Systems
 R. D. Laing, Self and others, Literary Encyclopedia

Anti-psychiatry
History of psychiatry